St. Michael Indian School (SMIS) is a private Roman Catholic day school. It is  part of Saint Michael Parish in the Roman Catholic Diocese of Gallup, New Mexico. It is located at St. Michaels chapter in the Navajo Nation.

History
St. Michael School was founded in 1902 by Saint Katharine Drexel, SBS, and construction on campus buildings began soon after.

Student body
97% of the student body are members of the Navajo Nation, and 3% are of other ethnicities.

Campus
 Saint Michael Elementary School is the oldest building on the campus and dates to its founding.
 Saint Michael High School was constructed in 1946 and houses the secondary grades.
 Saint Michael Chapel is utilized weekly for student mass.

References

 Hardin-Burrola, Elizabeth.  "St. Michael HS looks to build bridges", Independent.  August 27, 2004.

External links
 St. Michael High School
 Arizona Interscholastic Association: St. Michael High School
 St. Michael High School profile provided by schooltree.org

Educational institutions established in 1950
Catholic secondary schools in Arizona
Private K-12 schools in the United States
Private elementary schools in Arizona
Private middle schools in Arizona
Private high schools in Arizona
Catholic Church in Arizona
Schools in Apache County, Arizona
Education on the Navajo Nation
1950 establishments in Arizona
Schools founded by missionaries
Schools founded by St. Katharine Drexel
Education on the Navajo Nation